Group D of the 1986 FIFA World Cup was one of the groups of nations competing at the 1986 FIFA World Cup. The group's first round of matches began on 1 June and its last matches were played on 12 June. Most matches were played at the Estadio Jalisco and the Estadio Tres de Marzo in Guadalajara. Undefeated Brazil, with three clean slate shutouts, topped the group; Spain finished second. Both teams advanced to the second round. Northern Ireland and Algeria were the other two teams in the group.

Standings

Matches

Spain vs Brazil

Algeria vs Northern Ireland

Brazil vs Algeria

Northern Ireland vs Spain

Northern Ireland vs Brazil

Algeria vs Spain

Sources 
 (es) Spanish football Online Database

1986 FIFA World Cup
Spain at the 1986 FIFA World Cup
Northern Ireland at the 1986 FIFA World Cup
Brazil at the 1986 FIFA World Cup
Algeria at the 1986 FIFA World Cup